Police 5 is a British television programme that reconstructs major unsolved crimes in order to gain information from the public which may assist in solving the case. It originally aired on some ITV regions from 1962 to 1992, followed by a brief revival in 2014 on Channel 5.

Creation
Police 5 was commissioned, when Lew Grade needed a five-minute programme to fill a gap in the schedules for six weeks caused by an American import underrunning. The idea came from Steve Wade, Head of Outside Broadcasts, and, Grade refused to copyright the format which allowed other ITV regions to launch their own versions with Taylor often hosting them. Almost a third of the appeals featured in the programme led to an arrest.

The format was later sold overseas; in Germany it was a networked hour-long programme, Aktenzeichen XY… ungelöst (German for "Case number XY ... Unsolved") on ZDF since 1967, which became the blueprint for the BBC's Crimewatch (1984); Taylor had pitched the idea for a centralised version to Channel 4 in 1982 but the idea had been rejected.

History
The five-minute programme was originally produced by ATV for its London and Midlands region from 1962 and shortly afterwards the format was picked up by a number of other ITV network regions, some versions of which used the same name and presenter. These included LWT, Television South (TVS) and Central Independent Television. The show's original thirty-year run ended on 18 December 1992 in South and South East of England region due to the production company TVS losing its broadcasting franchise. Following negotiations with the next franchise holder, Meridian Broadcasting, it was decided not to continue Police 5.

In 1972, Taylor presented a spin-off show for younger viewers called Junior Police 5. His catchphrase was "keep 'em peeled!" – asking viewers to be vigilant. In 2014, Channel 5 revived Police 5 for a seven-part series with new presenters Joe Crowley and Kate McIntyre. At the age of 89, Taylor appeared on each half-hour programme for a short segment in which he “set out to reunite theft victims with what’s rightfully theirs”.

Other versions
Similar formats were aired in different ITV regions. Police Call was seen in the Anglia and Tyne Tees areas while Police File was the title adopted for programmes across Granada, Channel and Scottish Television areas. Police 6 was broadcast on Ulster Television in Northern Ireland. This version ran for 25 years until Christmas 1994, and was later replaced by Crime Call which was axed in 2001.

References

External links

1960s British crime television series
1962 British television series debuts
1970s British crime television series
1980s British crime television series
1990s British crime television series
2010s British crime television series
2014 British television series endings
British crime television series
ITV crime shows
Television shows produced by Associated Television (ATV)
Television shows produced by Central Independent Television
London Weekend Television shows
Television shows produced by Television South (TVS)
Channel 5 (British TV channel) original programming
Law enforcement in the United Kingdom
British television series revived after cancellation
English-language television shows